Chives is a member of the onion family grown for its leaves, which are used as a condiment.

Chives may also refer to:
 Chives, Charente-Maritime, a commune in the Charente-Maritime département, France
 The Chive, entertainment website
 Garlic chives or Chinese chives